The Iran national baseball team is the national baseball team of Iran. The team represents Iran in international competitions.

History
Iran baseball committee was founded in 1992 by Mohammad Bagher Zolfagharian. In 1993 it became a federation and continued to function as a federation until 2010, when it became part of Sports Associations Federation. This was largely caused by the inactivity of its national team due to the fact that there were not enough teams in the Middle East to play against and gain experience and also the team not being strong enough to play against the elite teams of East Asia.

Currently Baseball is played in 12 Provinces in Iran with the potential for many more if helped with the problem of shortage of equipment. Iran has one stadium specifically designed for baseball in the city of Karaj, but other cities for the most part use soccer fields for official games and practice sessions.

From 1994 until 2009, every year teams representing their provinces participated in a national championship with Tehran (10), Bushehr and Isfahan (2 each) and Kerman (1) splitting the championship trophies.

In 2010, the National Championship games were replaced by a Club Championship League. Club teams were split into a North and South conference with the top two teams in each conference advancing to the playoffs. Since the inception of this league, Tehran's Azarakhsh Club, Bushehr's Naderi Club and Kerman's Mes Club have been able to each win 1 championship.

Iran's national team has participated in 5 Asia Cups (1999, 2006, 2012, 2013 and 2015) and has been able to win the silver medal and bronze medal in the Western Division in 2012 and 2015.

Current Staff

Team Manager:   Kashef Rana (Tehran)
Head Coach:       Tino Martinez   
Coach:   Payam Shokat Sadri (Kish)
Coach:   Seyed Ali Emamzadeh (Bushehr) 
Assistant Coach:   Amir Bakhtiari Laghab (Bushehr)
Assistant Coach:   Farid Farhadi (Qom)
Physical Trainer:   Mohammad Mehdi Rafiei (Markazi)

Players

The most notable baseballer of partial Iranian origin is Yu Darvish who was born in Japan to a Japanese mother but has an Iranian father and plays in MLB, although he has not yet received an invitation to the national team.

Managerial history
 Mehrdad Hajian, pre-2009
 Gerardo Yassel Cabrera Moreno, January 2009
 Julio Alberto Hernandez Coste, April 2009
 Mehrdad Hajian, 2012-2014
 Toma Irokawa, January 2015-July 2015

Tournament history

Asian Baseball Cup

Presidential Cup

2015 Presidential Cup was an international tournament hosted by Iran, it was played from September 9–13 at Azadi Sport Complex which was won by 
India, other participants were Iraq

Achievements

Asian Baseball Cup - Western Division
  :  3rd
  :  2nd
  :  3rd

Iran Presidential Cup
  :  2nd

Recent fixtures and results

References

National baseball teams in Asia
baseball
Baseball in Iran